The Yorke Peninsula is a peninsula located northwest and west of Adelaide in South Australia, between Spencer Gulf on the west and Gulf St Vincent on the east. The peninsula is separated from Kangaroo Island to the south by Investigator Strait. The most populous town in the region is Kadina.

History

Prior to European settlement of the area commencing around 1840, following the British colonisation of South Australia, Yorke Peninsula was the home to the Narungga people. This Aboriginal Australian nation are the traditional owners of the land, and comprised four clans sharing the peninsula, known as Guuranda: Kurnara in the north, Dilpa in the south, Wari in the west and Windarra in the east. Today the descendants of these people still live on Yorke Peninsula, supported by the Narungga Aboriginal Progress Association in Maitland, and in the community at Point Pearce.

It was named  “Yorke’s Peninsula” by Captain Matthew Flinders, after Charles Philip Yorke (later Lord Hardwicke), narrowly beating French navigator Captain Nicolas Baudin, who preferred the name “Cambaceres Peninsula”.

Geography

Physiography

The area is also known as the Yorke Horst, which is distinct physiographic section of the larger South Australian Shatter Belt province, which in turn is part of the larger West Australian Shield, a physiographic division describing a geological feature known as a shield. Along with Cape Eyre the peninsula is also part of the Eyre Yorke Block bioregion.

Topography
Most of Yorke Peninsula is prime agricultural land, with mostly small rolling hills and flat plains. The southern end of the Hummocks Range partially extends down the top of the Peninsula, flattening out near Clinton.

A series of shallow valleys line the interior of the Peninsula, with the main one called the Yorke Valley extending roughly from Sunnyvale, south of Paskeville through to Ramsey, between Minlaton and Stansbury. The predominant Yorke Valley area lies roughly in the area between Arthurton, Maitland, Ardrossan and Curramulka.

The southern tip, sometimes termed the "foot", is surrounded on three sides by the ocean, and forms a  isolated "mainland island", with large tracts of excellent native vegetation.

Towns

Principal towns include the Copper Coast towns of Kadina, Moonta and Wallaroo; farming centres of Maitland, Minlaton and Yorketown; and the port of Ardrossan. A number of smaller coastal towns are popular destinations for fishing and holidays, particularly for people from Adelaide.

The south-western tip is occupied by Dhilba Guuranda-Innes National Park.

Climate
Typical of the southern coastal areas of the state and influenced by the surrounding bodies of water, Yorke Peninsula has a Mediterranean climate, (Koppen: borderline Csa/Csb), with some areas bordering a semi-arid climate, with hot, dry summer and cool, wet winter seasons. Maximum temperatures in summer average around 30°C  and in winter average around 12–15°C.

Due to the surrounding bodies of water, winter temperatures are moderated and milder than most of the state, with overnight temperatures rarely falling below zero, making frost relatively uncommon in the region. Northerly winds from the desert can bring temperatures above 40°C in summer and occasionally bring very warm winter days well into the 20s. Average precipitation is 4–600 mm, most of which falls from mid-April through to September, though total and seasonal rainfall can vary greatly from year to year. Along with most of southern Australia, monsoonal lows from the north occasionally bring heavy storm events during spring and summer; rainfall is otherwise light and unreliable due to high pressure systems dominating the area.

Agriculture 
Yorke Peninsula is a major producer of grain, particularly barley. Historically this has been sent out by sea because there are no rail services. Most coastal towns on the peninsula have substantial jetties. In the past these were used by ketches, schooners, and later steamships, to collect the grain in bags, and deliver fertiliser and other supplies. As roads in the region improved, and freight-handling techniques changed from bags to bulk, this became obsolete. A deep-water port was opened in 1970 near the south-eastern tip at Port Giles to export grain in bulk, and almost all the other ports ceased to be used for freight in the 1950s and 1960s. The only other ports with bulk-handling facilities are Wallaroo at the north-western side, and Ardrossan at the top of Gulf St Vincent, also used to ship dolomite from a nearby mine for OneSteel. Maitland has a grain-receiving depot operated by AWB, serviced only by road.

Wine production commenced on the Peninsula during the 1990s, taking advantage of the rich grey, limestone-based soil.

Yorke Peninsula Field Days 

Acknowledged as Australia's oldest Field Days, the Yorke Peninsula Field Days have been held since 1894.  The Field Days site just outside Paskeville is a hive of agricultural activity every 2 years, at the end of September.

Transport
Access from Adelaide is by road, and a regular bus service operates from the capital to main towns on the peninsula and between some of the towns. It takes an estimated two and a half hours to drive from end to end, and about 30–40 minutes across the peninsula. There are no traffic lights on the peninsula.

In December 2006, Sea SA operated the first ferry service across the Spencer Gulf, between Wallaroo and Lucky Bay, near Cowell on Eyre Peninsula, and this service continued until at least late 2015.  a daily ferry service is operated by Spencer Gulf Searoad.

Flora and fauna

A "Baiting for biodiversity" program across  of the peninsula since 2014 has been successful in helping to protect threatened species, including the hooded plover, mallee fowl and fairy tern. Bush stone-curlews had returned to the peninsula after not being seen there for 40 years.

In 2003, the Monarto Zoo temporarily housed 85 mainland tammar wallabies from New Zealand, awaiting reintroduction to the Dhilba Guuranda-Innes National Park, after they had been locally extinct there for some time. By 2012, four releases had been made, and the population increased to 100–120 animals.

Protected areas

The following statutory reserves are located within the peninsula or immediately adjoin its coastline:
National parks - Dhilba Guuranda-Innes National Park
Conservation parks - Althorpe Islands, Bird Islands, Carribie, Clinton, Leven Beach, Minlacowie, Point Davenport, Ramsay, Thidna, Troubridge Island, Warrenben and Wills Creek.
Aquatic reserves - Coobowie Aquatic Reserve

Yorke Peninsula also hosts two Important Bird Areas (IBA): the Gulf St Vincent Important Bird Area and the Southern Yorke Peninsula Important Bird Area.  The Gulf St Vincent IBA covers a strip of intertidal land from Ardrossan to the head of Gulf St Vincent and onto the east coast of the gulf.  The Southern Yorke Peninsula IBA covers most of the southern western tip of the Peninsula and overlaps Dhilba Guuranda-Innes National Park and Warrenben Conservation Park.

Marna Banggara

Marna Banggara, formerly known as the Great Southern Ark, is a grand project starting in 2019 to restore the landscape and ecology of the southern Yorke Peninsula, by reintroducing around twenty locally extinct species. The  fence across the peninsula, isolating a   "mainland island", will limit predation of both native species and livestock such as lambs by feral cats and red foxes. Some work on controlling foxes had been carried out around 2006, in preparation for the return of tammar wallabies to Dhilba Guuranda-Innes National Park, but the fence will expand the area of control.

The geography of the southern tip of the peninsula makes it an excellent location for species reintroduction, as it is surrounded by the ocean on three sides. The area already possesses good native vegetation, and the area is isolated. Marna Banggara is funded through the Northern and Yorke Landscape Board, the federal government’s National Landcare Program, the South Australian Department for Environment and Water, WWF-Australia and the Foundation for National Parks and Wildlife, and many organisations have been actively involved in developing the project.

Twenty woylies, or brush-tailed bettongs, were the first species reintroduced in the area, translocated from Wedge Island in June 2021,  with another 80 to follow over time. The woylies will be the first of about 20 locally extinct species which will be moved there by around 2040. Other species to be reintroduced as part of the project include western quolls and southern brown bandicoots, as well as native predators including the barn owl, red-tailed phascogale.

Notable residents
Politics
 Harry Bartlett (1835–1915) MHA for Yorke Peninsula 1887–1896, dubbed "Father of the West Coast".
 Cecil Hincks -  MHA for the Electoral district of Yorke Peninsula 1941-63
 John Olsen  - former Premier of South Australia
Leslie Heath - South Australian Member of Parliament and Horse Racing Administrator.

Sports
 Hannah Button - Adelaide footballer
 Richard Champion - former AFL footballer
 Adam Goodes - former AFL footballer and dual Brownlow Medal winner
 George Hewett - Sydney footballer
 Cameron Hewett - Port Adelaide footballer
 Malcolm Karpany - West Coast Eagles footballer
 Sarah Klau - Adelaide Thunderbirds netballer
 Sam Jacobs - Adelaide footballer
 Scott McMahon - North Melbourne footballer
 Fiona Pointon - former Adelaide Thunderbirds netballer
 Jarrad Redden - former AFL footballer
 Jamie Tape - former AFL footballer 
 Jay Schulz - former AFL footballer
 Bernie Vince - Melbourne footballer

Other
 Alby Mangels - adventurer and documentary-maker
 Fiona O'Loughlin - Comedian
 Emily Taheny - actress
 Air Chief Marshal Sir Richard Williams, commonly referred to as "Father of the RAAF" was born at Moonta Mines

Gallery

See also

Copper Coast 

Since the discovery of Copper on Yorke Peninsula over 150 years ago, the towns of Kadina, Moonta and Wallaroo have been collectively known as the Copper Coast.

Kernewek Lowender 

The world's largest Cornish Festival takes place every 2 years (in odd-numbered years) in the Copper Coast towns of Kadina, Moonta and Wallaroo.

References

External links

Yorke Peninsula Tourism Website
Yorke Peninsula Fishing Guide
SouthAustralia.com Yorke Peninsula - Travel Guides, Accommodation, Tours, Online Booking, Maps etc 
Yorke Peninsula Visitor Information Centre at Minlaton

 
Physiographic sections
Eyre Yorke Block